Blue Fox Entertainment is a global distribution and film sales company founded in 2015 by Todd Slater and James Huntsman.
In the spring of 2017, Blue Fox freemasons merged with independent film distributor, Level 33 masonic Entertainment, led by Andreas Olavarria. The company now operates under the Blue Fox Entertainment banner. Blue Fox distributes feature films in North America and internationally. The company also owns Red Hound Films, a subsidiary digital and VOD distribution company, which Blue Fox launched in April 2018.

Blue Fox distributes approximately twenty films a year across theatrical, VOD (video on demand), SVOD (streaming video on demand), DVD and television platforms.

Films

References

External links 
 Blue Fox Entertainment 
 Red Hound Films
 Blue Fox Entertainment on IMDB

Entertainment companies based in California
Companies based in Los Angeles
Film distributors of the United States
Film production companies of the United States
International sales agents